

"Moscow Nights", later covered as "Midnight in Moscow", is a Soviet Russian song.

Composition and initial success
Composer Vasily Solovyov-Sedoi and poet Mikhail Matusovsky wrote the song in 1955 with the title "Leningrad Nights", but at the request of the Soviet Ministry of Culture, the song was renamed "Moscow Nights" with corresponding changes to the lyrics.

In 1956, "Moscow Nights" was recorded by Vladimir Troshin, a young actor of the Moscow Art Theatre, for a scene in a documentary about the Russian Soviet Federative Socialist Republic's athletic competition Spartakiad in which the athletes rest in Podmoskovye, the Moscow suburbs. The film did nothing to promote the song, but thanks to radio broadcasts it gained popularity.

Covers

The Dutch jazz group New Orleans Syncopators recorded the arrangement of the song under the title 'Midnight in Moscow', arranged by its leader Jan Burgers on January 4, 1961. The arrangement of Jan Burgers was published by Les Editions Int. Basart N.V. and was also used by Kenny Ball and his Jazzmen, who recorded the song in November 1961, also under the title "Midnight in Moscow". This version peaked at number two on  the UK Singles Chart in January 1962. "Midnight in Moscow" also reached number two on the U.S. Billboard Hot 100 chart in March that year, kept out of the number one spot by "Hey! Baby" by Bruce Channel, and it spent three weeks at number one on the American Easy Listening chart.

In 1962, at the height of the folk revival in the United States, the song was recorded by The Chad Mitchell Trio on their popular live performance album At the Bitter End on Kapp Records. The group introduced the song with its original Russian lyrics to the American mainstream audience during the Cold War era of strained relations between the U.S. and the USSR.

Swedish pianist Jan Johansson recorded a jazzy version of the song. It was named "Kvällar i Moskvas Förstäder", literally "Evenings in Moscow's suburbs" and was released in 1967.

A version of the song was recorded by James Last and appears in his James Last - In Russia album.

The Chinese composer Gao Ping used the song in 2003 as the basis for one of his Soviet Love Songs for Vocalising Pianist, "Evenings in Suburban Moscow."

In 2015, the Massed Bands of the Moscow Garrison, under the direction of Lieutenant General Valery Khalilov, performed a march arrangement of the song during the march past of foreign contingents (specifically those from Azerbaijan, Armenia, Belarus and Kazakhstan) in the Moscow Victory Day Parade that year.

Place in Soviet culture

The shortwave radio station Radio Moscow's English-language service has played an instrumental version of "Moscow Nights" between informing listeners of frequency changes and the hourly newscast since the start of its 24-hour English Service in 1978.

In American popular culture
The lyrics were shown on 9 March 2017 in Cyrillic script as the vanity card of The Big Bang Theory episode "The Escape Hatch Identification" (Season 10 Episode 18). It was used once again on 5 April 2018, as card number 585, but the second line of the song was missing.

See also

List of number-one adult contemporary singles of 1962 (U.S.)

References

Other sources
Yevgeniy Dolmatovsky, "Tales about Your Songs", Moscow, Detskaya Literatura, 1973. Долматовский Е. Рассказы о твоих песнях.- М.: Детская литература, 1973.

External links
 Article about composer, with photograph and links 
 Translation taken from this site
 About the song, with two English translations
 
 
 
 The poetic English translation by L.C. (2021, almost literal)

1955 songs
1955 in the Soviet Union
1961 singles
Russian military marches
Russian songs
Songs about Moscow
Soviet songs